Lee Yeon-ju (born 1 March 1990) is a South Korean female volleyball player. She was part of the South Korea women's national volleyball team.

She participated in the 2009 FIVB Volleyball World Grand Prix.
On club level she played for KT&G in 2009.

References

External links
 Profile at FIVB.org

1990 births
Living people
South Korean women's volleyball players
Place of birth missing (living people)